Virgibacillus carmonensis is a bacterium. It is Gram-positive, rod-shaped and moderately halophilic, originally isolated from deteriorated mural paintings. LMG 20964T (=DSM 14868T) is its type strain.

References

Further reading
Da Silva, Neusely, et al. Microbiological Examination Methods of Food and Water: A Laboratory Manual. CRC Press, 2012.
Staley, James T., et al. "Bergey's manual of systematic bacteriology, vol. 3."Williams and Wilkins, Baltimore, MD (1989): 2250–2251.

External links

LPSN
Type strain of Virgibacillus carmonensis at BacDive -  the Bacterial Diversity Metadatabase

Bacillaceae
Bacteria described in 2003